Crosswalk Project was an open-source web app runtime built with the latest releases of Chromium and Blink from Google. The project was founded by Intel's Open Source Technology Center in September 2013. 

As of February 2017 Intel ceased to actively support the project, saying: "Crosswalk 23 is our last stable release. After that we will no longer fix specific bugs but will leave the source code and binaries available for Crosswalk users to continue building applications."

Features
The primary features included:
 Support for: Android, iOS (limited), Linux, Windows 10 and Tizen.
 Web Audio, WebRTC, Intel RealSense, WebGL, Web Components, Web workers, CSS transforms, HTML canvas 2D context, Media Queries level 3

Apache Cordova
Apache Cordova is a set of device APIs for accessing device capabilities and sensors. Crosswalk Project integrated with Cordova to enable both the Cordova device APIs and the Crosswalk advanced Web runtime.

Tools integrating Crosswalk Project
Crosswalk Project was a part of the following developer tools:
 AppGyver: a UI framework for building hybrid mobile apps
 Cocos2d-x: a suite of open-source, cross-platform, game-development tools
 Cordova/PhoneGap: a platform for building native mobile applications using HTML, CSS and JavaScript
 famo.us: a JavaScript framework with an open source 3D layout engine integrated with a 3D physics animation engine that can render to DOM, Canvas, or WebGL
 Intel XDK: a cross-platform development tool to create and deploy web and hybrid apps across multiple app stores and form factor devices
 ionic: an open-source front-end SDK for developing hybrid mobile apps with HTML5
 ManifoldJS: a tool to create hosted apps across platforms and devices, and package web experience as native apps across Android, iOS, and Windows
 Monaca: cloud-powered tools and services to simplify PhoneGap/Cordova hybrid mobile app development
 Scirra's Construct 2: an HTML5 game creator for 2D games
 Sencha Web Application Manager: an application platform for deploying and managing web apps on desktops, tablets, and smartphones
 telerik: an instantly available PhoneGap/Cordova-based development environment that enables cross-platform hybrid mobile apps to be created using HTML5, JavaScript and CSS
 trigger.io: a hybrid app runtime for artists

Standards
Crosswalk Project provided a web application framework based on common standards:  HTML, CSS, JavaScript, and web APIs created and supported by W3C, WHATWG and TC39.

License
Crosswalk Project was open-source and licensed under BSD license.

References

2013 software
Free and open-source Android software
Android (operating system) development software
Free software programmed in C++
Cross-platform free software
Software using the BSD license
Google software
Software based on WebKit
Google Chrome